Tabore Parish is an administrative unit of Augšdaugava Municipality in the Selonia region of Latvia.

Towns, villages and settlements of Tabore Parish 
 Tabore

 
Parishes of Latvia
Selonia